Antti Pennanen (born 5 February 1979) is a Finnish former ice hockey player and current head coach for Ilves of the Finnish Liiga and Finland men's national junior ice hockey team. He previously served as the head coach for Jukurit and HPK in the Finnish Liiga.

Playing career
Pennanen made his professional debut for HPK during the 1999–2000 season. He then played for Hyvinkään Ahmat during the inaugural Mestis season in 2000–01.

Coaching career
Pennanen served as an assistant coach for HIFK from 2011 to 2013, and an assistant coach for KalPa from 2013 to 2015. He then served as head coach of Jukurit from 2014 to 2016 and won the Mestis championship in 2015 and 2016. He served as the head coach for HPK from 2016 to 2020. He helped lead HPK to the 2019 Kanada-malja as Liiga champions, and was subsequently awarded the Kalevi Numminen trophy.

Pennanen served as an assistant coach for Finland men's national junior ice hockey team that won a gold medal at the 2016 World Junior Ice Hockey Championships. He also served as an assistant coach for Finland men's national ice hockey team that won a gold medal at the 2019 IIHF World Championship. On 12 February 2019, he was named the head coach for Finland men's national junior ice hockey team for the 2021 and 2022 World Junior Ice Hockey Championships. Pennanen was critical of the IIHF following the cancellation of the 2022 World Junior Championship due to the COVID-19 pandemic, stating the tournament was poorly managed.

On 5 October 2022, Pennanen was named head coach of Ilves of the Finnish Liiga.

Career statistics

References

External links

1979 births
Living people
Finnish ice hockey coaches
Finnish ice hockey players
HPK players
People from Hausjärvi
Sportspeople from Kanta-Häme